Cancún Futbol Club is a Mexican professional football club based in Cancún, Quintana Roo currently playing in Liga de Expansión MX. The club was established in June 2020 after the Cafetaleros de Chiapas franchise announced that it would be moving to the city of Cancún.

History
In June 2020, a possible move of Atlante F.C. began to be speculated, the team played at home in Cancun. On 26 June, the relocation of that club to Mexico City became official. The same day, the relocation of Cafetaleros de Chiapas was announced, the team was moved to Cancún and renamed as Cancún F.C.

On 30 June 2020, the club appointed Christian Giménez as its first manager.

In January 2022 the team was bought by an investment fund headed by Mexican-American businessman Jeff Luhnow, however, due to regulatory issues, José Luis Orantes remained in the presidency until the end of the 2021–22 season. On 1 June 2022, the sale was approved by the owners of the Liga de Expansión MX clubs, making the entry of the new owner official.

Personnel

Management

Coaching staff

Players

First-team squad

Out on loan

Reserve teams
Pioneros de Cancún
Reserve team that plays in the Liga Premier, the third level of the Mexican league system.

Pioneros Junior
 Reserve team that plays in the Liga TDP, the fourth level of the Mexican league system.

Managers
  Christian Giménez (2020–2021)
  Federico Vilar (2021–2022)
  Iñigo Idiakez (2022–)

References

Association football clubs established in 2020
2020 establishments in Mexico
Football clubs in Quintana Roo
Sports teams in Cancún